Two ships of the United States Navy have been named Bobolink, after the American bird, the bobolink.

 , was commissioned in 1919 and decommissioned in 1946.
 , was originally YMS-164 and renamed Bobolink in 1947. She was struck in 1960.

References
 

United States Navy ship names